Ultimate Sky Surfer, known as simply , is a video game developed by Toka and published by Idea Factory and Midas Interactive Entertainment for PlayStation 2 in 2000-2001.

Reception

The game received unfavorable reviews according to the review aggregation website GameRankings. Frank O'Connor of NextGen called the Japanese import "A game so dull and listless that it almost defines the concept of duff launch software." In Japan, Famitsu gave it a score of 22 out of 40.

References

External links
 

2000 video games
Extreme sports video games
Idea Factory games
PlayStation 2 games
PlayStation 2-only games
Single-player video games
Toka (company) games
Video games developed in France